A solid pseudopapillary tumour is a low-grade malignant neoplasm of the pancreas of papillary architecture that typically afflicts young women.

Signs and symptoms
Solid pseudopapillary tumours are often asymptomatic and are identified incidentally on imaging performed for unrelated reasons.  Less often, they may cause abdominal pain. Solid pseudopapillary tumours tend to occur in women, and most often present in the third decade of life.

Anatomy

Gross morphology
Solid pseudopapillary tumours are typically round, well-demarcated, measuring 2–17 cm in diameter (average 8 cm), with solid and cystic areas with hemorrhage on cut sections.

Histomorphology
Solid pseudopapillary tumours consist of solid sheets of cells that are focally dyscohesive.  The cells in the lesion usually have uniform nuclei with occasional nuclear grooves, eosinophilic or clear cytoplasm and PAS positive eosinophilic intracytoplasmic globules. Necrosis is usually present and, as cell death preferentially occurs distant from blood vessels, lead to the formation of pseudopapillae.

Immunohistochemistry
Solid pseudopapillary tumours show positive nuclear staining for beta catenin, as well as positive immunostaining for CD10, CD56, vimentin, alpha 1-antitrypsin, and neuron specific enolase; they are negative for chromogranin and pancreatic enzymes.

Diagnosis

The gold standard for diagnosing solid pseudopapillary tumour of the pancreas is cytopathology by endoscopic ultrasound (EUS) guided fine needle aspiration (FNA) of the lesion. After surgical excision, the tumor can undergo histopathology evaluation for cancer staging.

Management
In most cases, solid pseudopapillary tumours should be resected surgically, as there is a risk of malignancy (cancer).

See also
Pancreatic cancer
Pancreatic mucinous cystic neoplasm
Serous cystadenoma of the pancreas

References

Digestive system neoplasia
Pancreatic cancer